Ghim Moh  is a neighbourhood located in Queenstown, Singapore. The estate consists of 28 blocks.

Facilities
There were a few schools located within the estate, Ghim Moh Primary School, which has merged with New Town Primary in 2008 and Ghim Moh Secondary School, which has also merged with Jin Tai Secondary School to form Clementi Woods Secondary School since 2007. In addition, Raffles Junior College was located right next to Ghim Moh (Mount Sinai) from 1984 to 2004. The campus is still around and had housed Dunman High School from 2007 to 2008. Up until December 2015, it houses Raffles Girls Primary School as it undergoes upgrading at its previous premises. From 2017 to 2019, it hosted the newly formed Eunoia Junior College.

The Ulu Pandan Community Centre is also located within the estate. Ghim Moh estate also includes a wet market and a food centre. There are also several coffee shops (as locally known, including 'Kopitiam'), salons, dental clinics and medical clinics located within the estate.

It is near to Ministry of Education Headquarters, Fusionopolis, Rochester Park and Biopolis, where many of the life-science businesses are located.

Transport
Its nearest MRT station is Buona Vista station. There are also a number of bus routes that serve Ghim Moh and terminate at the Ghim Moh Bus Terminal.
These include routes 92, 92M, 100, 111. Thus, residents find it convenient to travel around the city, particularly to the Orchard, Harbourfront and Central Business District.

Politics
Ghim Moh belongs to the Ulu Pandan division of Holland–Bukit Timah Group Representation Constituency, whose Member of Parliament is Christopher de Souza. Between 2001 and 2006, the Member of Parliament was Minister for Community Development, Youth and Sports Vivian Balakrishnan, who became the Member of Parliament for the Cashew division in 2006. Ulu Pandan existed in its own constituency before 1997 and its Member of Parliament was Minister (Prime Minister's Office) Lim Boon Heng from 1991 to 2001.

Gallery

References

External links
Food outlets in Ghim Moh

Places in Singapore
Housing estates in Singapore
Queenstown, Singapore
Hokkien place names